Kaj (also Romanized as Kāj; also known as Gāch Kaj and Qāch Kaj) is a city in the Central District of Ardal County, Chaharmahal and Bakhtiari province, Iran. At the 2006 census, its population was 3,774 in 800 households, when it was a village in Poshtkuh Rural District. The following census in 2011 counted 4,027 people in 982 households. The latest census in 2016 showed a population of 4,227 people in 1,167 households, by which time Kaj had been elevated to the status of a city. The city is populated by Lurs.

References 

Ardal County

Cities in Chaharmahal and Bakhtiari Province

Populated places in Chaharmahal and Bakhtiari Province

Luri settlements in Chaharmahal and Bakhtiari Province

Populated places in Ardal County